Cruls may refer to:

 Luís Cruls (1848–1908), Belgian-born Brazilian astronomer and geodesist
 Cruls (crater), a crater on Mars
 Cruls Islands, located in the Wilhelm Archipelago
 Refuge Astronomer Cruls, Brazilian Antarctic summer facility